Golden Noble is an old English cultivar of domesticated apple, which is especially used as a cooking apple, since it is resulting in a sweetish puree when cooked and is a good choice for apple sauce.

The fruits of this cultivar are light green and turn yellow gold with ripeness and are very juicy, making it also a good choice for apple cider of a balanced tart and sweet taste. It is considered of good taste by those who choose to eat them fresh.

It was initially discovered, as a chance seedling near Downham Market, Norfolk, by Patrick Flanagan, head gardener for Sir Thomas Hare of Stow Bardolph Hall. He presented it in 1820 to the Horticultural Society of London.

This tree is specializing for gardening, having a neat and tidy growing habit, and producing beautiful flowers. It have earned the Award of Garden Merit by the Royal Horticultural Society in 1993. Sugar 12%, acid 18g/litre, vitamin C 24mg/100g.

It is an ancestor for the Edward VII apple.

References

British apples
Cooking apples
Apple cultivars